Phạm Việt Anh Khoa (born May 11, 1981) is a Vietnamese movie producer, entrepreneur and founder of Saiga Films, notable by some of Victor Vu films  including  Inferno (2010), Battle of the Brides (2011), Blood letter (2012), Scandal (2012) và Battle of the Brides 2

Filmography

Inferno – Giao Lo Dinh Menh (2010)
Battle of the Brides (2011)
Blood letter (2012)
Scandal (2012)
Battle of the Brides 2 (2013)
The Mask (2016)

References

External links
 

1981 births
Living people
Vietnamese film producers